Stephen West is an American knitter, fashion designer, educator, and author known for his knitting patterns and strong use of color. After beginning to publish his own patterns in 2009 on sites like Knitty and Ravelry, West has also published a number of knitting books under his design brand Westknits. He owns a yarn store in Amsterdam, Netherlands, and in 2019 he launched a yarn brand called West Wool with his business partner Malia Mae Joseph.

Born in Tulsa, Oklahoma, West moved to Chicago as a teenager. A trained dancer, he studied dance at the University of Illinois Department of Dance. While in school he learned to knit and enjoyed it greatly. He later recalled, "I could always be found knitting between rehearsals, back stage and in between classes." West then moved to Amsterdam to pursue a degree in choreography from the School for New Dance Development at the Academy of Theatre and Dance. While there, he continued knitting and creating patterns, acquiring more recognition for his designs.

West regularly publishes patterns, leads knit-alongs, and shares photos on his Westknits Instagram, which had over 174 thousand followers as of April 2020. He is also known for his sense of humor, eccentric clothing, and creatively choreographed knitting-themed music videos. He has collaborated with yarn dyer Adella Colvin.

References

University of Illinois alumni
People in knitting
American fashion designers
Year of birth missing (living people)
Living people
American textile artists
Writers from Chicago
Writers from Tulsa, Oklahoma
American choreographers